The Huairou Solar Observing Station is a solar observatory in China. It is situated ono the north bank of the Huairou Reservoir, in Huairou District, Beijing, about 60 km north of central Beijing. There are two telescopes. It is operated by the National Astronomical Observatory of China, part of the Chinese Academy of Science.

See also
 List of astronomical observatories

References

External links
Official site

Solar observatories
Astronomical observatories in China
Huairou District